Shepherds is a closed railway platform on the Main South railway line in New South Wales, Australia. The platform opened in 1893 and closed in 1975. No trace now remains of the platform.

References

Disused regional railway stations in New South Wales
Railway stations closed in 1975
Railway stations in Australia opened in 1893
Main Southern railway line, New South Wales